Kamnesia is the third album by rapper, Kam. It was released on March 20, 2001, for Hard Tyme Records, JCOR Entertainment/Interscope Records and featured production from DJ Wino, DJ Pooh and Jazze Pha. Kamnesia peaked at No. 69 on the Top R&B/Hip-Hop Albums chart and No. 40 on the Top Heatseekers chart in Billboard Magazine.

Track listing
"Kamnesia"- 4:43  
"Have a Fit"- 4:11  
"Where I Come From"- 3:42  
"Benefits"- 3:40  
"Bounce Trick"- 4:22 (feat. Jazze Pha)
"Bang Bang"- 4:05 (feat. Mystic)
"They Like Dat"- 4:08 (feat. Dresta, Jayo Felony, Yukmouth & Spider)
"Let's Hook Up"- 4:15 
" What I Look Like"- 3:26 (featuring Mystic)
"Giddie Up"- 3:54  
"The Godbrotha [Intro]"- 1:49  
"Godbrotha"- 4:13  
"Active"- 3:37  
"Wardance"- 4:18

References 

2001 albums
Kam (rapper) albums
Albums produced by Jazze Pha
Albums produced by DJ Pooh
Interscope Records albums
Political music albums by American artists